These are tables of congressional delegations from Oregon to the United States Senate and United States House of Representatives.

The current Oregon delegation consists of 6 congresspersons and 2 senators serving in the 118th United States Congress. The dean of the current delegation is Senator Ron Wyden, having served in the Senate since 1996 and in Congress since 1981.

United States Senate

U.S. House of Representatives

Current representatives

1849–1859: One non-voting delegate

1859–1893: One seat

After statehood on February 14, 1859, Oregon had one seat, elected at-large statewide.

1893–present: multiple seats

Key

See also

 List of United States congressional districts
 Oregon's congressional districts
 Political party strength in Oregon

Footnotes

 
Oregon
 
Congressional delegations